Joseph Peterson may refer to:

 Joseph Peterson (psychologist) (1878–1935), American psychologist
 Joseph G. Peterson (born 1965), American novelist and poet
 Joseph R. Peterson (1904–1967), American lawyer and politician
 Joseph Peterson, American tobacco merchant, builder of Peterson–Dumesnil House
 Joe Peterson, American academic

See also
 Peterson Joseph (born 1990), Haitian footballer
 Joseph Peters (disambiguation)